Chandon is a commune in the Loire department in central France.

Population

References

See also
Communes of the Loire department

Communes of Loire (department)